Cochylis carmelana is a species of moth of the  family Tortricidae. It is found in the United States, where it has been recorded along the coast of California.

The wingspan is about 13 mm. Adults have been recorded on wing in February and April.

References

Moths described in 1907
Cochylis